Al Aqda (also Romanized as Al ‘Aqdā; also known as Al Agdah, ‘Alī ‘Agad, ‘Alī ‘Agdeh, Ali Akdeh, Al ‘Oqdeh, Kūt Saiyid Husain, and Parvast) is a village in Qaleh Chenan Rural District, in the Central District of Karun County, Khuzestan Province, Iran. At the 2006 census, its population was 415, in 73 families. The village was chosen as the capital of Qaleh Chenan Rural District when it was created on January 23, 2013.

References 

Populated places in Karun County